Douchy may refer to the following places in France:

 Douchy, Aisne, a commune in the department of Aisne
 Douchy, Loiret, a commune in the department of Loiret
 Douchy-lès-Ayette, a commune in the department of Pas-de-Calais
 Douchy-les-Mines, a commune in the department of Nord